The 1995 Amílcar Cabral Cup was held in Nouakchott, Mauritania.

Group stage

Group A

Group B

Knockout stage

Semi-finals

Third place match

Final

References
Details in RSSSF archives

Amílcar Cabral Cup